Grevillea pieroniae is a species of plant in the protea family that is endemic to Australia.

Etymology
The specific epithet pieroniae honours botanical artist and author Margaret Pieroni for her advancement of knowledge of the flora of Australia.

Description
The species is an erect, wispy shrub that grows to a height of 0.5–1.5 m and a width of about 1 m. Its white flowers appear in axillary conflorescences. It flowers from mid-winter until spring, fruiting in late spring.

Distribution and habitat
The species occurs in the Stirling Range National Park in the Esperance Plains IBRA bioregion, in south-west Western Australia. It grows near watercourses and areas of impeded drainage in marri-jarrah woodland and proteaceous heath shrubland.

References

pieroniae
Proteales of Australia
Endemic flora of Australia
Flora of Western Australia
Plants described in 2020